The 2023 Tour Championship (officially the 2023 Duelbits Tour Championship) is an upcoming professional snooker tournament that will take place from 27 March to 2 April 2023 at the Bonus Arena in Hull, England. Organised by the World Snooker Tour, it will be the fifth edition of the Tour Championship, first held in 2019, and the 14th and penultimate ranking event of the 2022–23 snooker season, preceding the 2023 World Snooker Championship. The last of three events in the Players Series, following the 2023 World Grand Prix and the 2023 Players Championship, it will comprise the top eight players on the one-year ranking list as it stands after the 2023 WST Classic. Broadcast by ITV Sport in the United Kingdom and by multiple other broadcasters internationally, the event features a prize fund of £380,000, of which the winner will receive £150,000.

Neil Robertson retained the title in 2022, defeating John Higgins 10–9 in the final. However, Robertson was unable to defend the title at the 2023 edition as he was outside the top eight on the one-year ranking list after the WST Classic.

Prize fund 
The total prize fund for the event was £380,000, with the winner receiving £150,000. A breakdown of the prize money for the event is shown below:
 Winner: £150,000
 Runner-up: £60,000
 Semi-final: £40,000
 Quarter-final: £20,000
 Highest break: £10,000
 Total: £380,000

Seeding List 
The participants will be determined by the points won in the ranking tournaments in the season's events preceding the Tour Championship. Points earned from the 2022 Championship League to the 2023 WST Classic will be counted.

Tournament draw 
The draw for the event will be shown below.

Final
The scores from the final will be shown below.

Century breaks

Duelbits Series
The Duelbits Series features three events: the World Grand Prix, the Players Championship, and the Tour Championship. The winner of the series is decided based on most win points on these tournaments.

Bold: Winner of the tournament.

References

Tour Championship (snooker)
Tour Championship
Tour Championship
Tour Championship
Tour Championship
Tour Championship
Sport in Kingston upon Hull